Corina Drăgan-Terecoasa (born 15 December 1971) is a Romanian luger. She competed at the 1992 Winter Olympics and the 1998 Winter Olympics.

References

1971 births
Living people
Romanian female lugers
Olympic lugers of Romania
Lugers at the 1992 Winter Olympics
Lugers at the 1998 Winter Olympics
People from Comarnic